The Regina Cyclone, or Regina tornado of 1912, was a tornado that devastated the city of Regina, Saskatchewan, Canada, on Sunday, June 30, 1912. It remains the deadliest tornado in Canadian history with a total of 28 fatalities and about 300 people injured. At about 4:50 p.m., green funnel clouds formed and touched down south of the city, tearing through the residential area between Wascana Lake and Victoria Avenue, and continuing through the downtown business district, rail yards, warehouse district, and northern residential area.

Meteorological synopsis

Occurrence

The tornado hit Regina at approximately 5:00 p.m. on June 30, 1912. The tornado formed 18 km south of the city and was roughly 150 metres wide by the time it reached Regina. The worst damage was in the residential area north of Wascana Lake and the central business district. Many buildings, both brick and wood, were entirely destroyed. "The new Central Library building was opened May 11, 1912, and just six weeks later, the new library was among the many buildings that suffered damage."

"In just twenty minutes it completely leveled a number of houses, and caused other houses to explode as the pressure inside the structures rose when the tornado passed overhead." The affluent residential area to the south was substantially diminished, but the tornado left houses untouched here and there immediately adjacent to houses which were flattened. "[I]n the warehouse district, it destroyed many of the storage buildings. The CPR Roundhouse was stripped to the rafters, and boxcars were pulled from the tracks and hurtled into the air."

Such damage was especially appalling to see as well as experience since Regina had been built on an entirely featureless plain, lacking any trees or vegetation other than natural wild prairie grass and without any hills or rivers apart from the tiny spring runoff Wascana Creek, which only flowed in early spring.

"The cyclone claimed twenty-eight lives and was the worst in Canadian history in terms of deaths. It also rendered 2,500 persons temporarily homeless, and caused over $1,200,000 in property damage. It took the city two years to repair the damage and ten years to pay off its storm debt."

Aftermath

The city forced those rendered homeless by the disaster to pay for the nightly use of cots set up in schools and city parks. It also required homeowners to pay for the removal of rubble from their homes. Debris was cleaned up quickly. "The storm damaged the Metropolitan Methodist Church, [the Knox Presbyterian Church, the First Methodist,] the library, the YWCA [and YMCA], and numerous other downtown buildings; in the warehouse district, it destroyed many of the storage buildings. 

Damage from the tornado is estimated to be F4 on the Fujita scale. The tornado killed 28 people, injured hundreds, and left 2,500 people homeless, out of a population of about 30,213 (in 1911). Around 500 buildings were destroyed or damaged. Property damage was quantified at $1.2 million CAD, and it would be forty years before the $4.5 million CAD private and public debt incurred to rebuild and repair was repaid.

The only remaining "souvenir" of this event is different-coloured bricks on the north wall of Regina's Knox-Metropolitan United Church (the building of the pre-church union of 1925 Metropolitan Methodist), showing where the wall collapsed and was rebuilt. Knox Presbyterian, Metropolitan Methodist and First Baptist, all being brick, were quickly rebuilt. Knox and Metropolitan both became United Church in 1925, and merged their congregations in 1951 and became the Knox-Metropolitan Church. The Knox building was ultimately demolished.

Boris Karloff's connection

English actor William Henry Pratt, better known by his stage name Boris Karloff, was in Regina at the time of the tornado as a member of the Jeanne Russell Players, a struggling company of actors and singers. Theatre reviews appearing in at least four Western Canadian newspapers in 1912 prove he had already started using the stage name "Boris Karloff" by this time. The Jeanne Russell Players disbanded in Regina a day before the tornado struck, leaving Karloff stranded and broke. Following the tornado, he worked clearing debris for twenty cents an hour and was later employed in Regina by the Dominion Express Company. He remained in Regina until October 1912 when he joined the Harry St. Clair Players in Prince Albert. In 1958, Karloff appeared on the talk and game show Front Page Challenge where he was featured not because of his fame as a Hollywood actor, but because of his association with the Regina Cyclone of 1912.

American stage actress Henrietta Crosman, who also later went on to Hollywood, was also in Regina at the time of the disaster and toured the devastation with members of her troupe. Her company staged a benefit performance of Catherine Chisholm Cushing's comedy "The Real Thing" at the Regina Theatre (12th Avenue and Hamilton Street, previously on the site of the old Hudson's Bay department store, opened in 1910)  on July 4, 1912, with a portion of the proceeds going to the tornado relief fund.

Over the years, some historians have mistakenly placed Karloff as a member of Crosman's company or as a member of the vaudevillian Albini-Avolos Company, which was a third theatrical troupe in Regina at the time of the 1912 tornado. The Albini-Avolos staged benefit performances for the tornado victims at the Regina Theatre on July 1 and 2.

Popular culture
Boris Karloff, Jeanne Russell, Henrietta Crosman, and the Albini-Avolos are all characters in BD Miller's musical drama, "Swept Off Our Feet: Boris Karloff and the Regina Cyclone", which commemorated the 100th anniversary of the disaster and premiered as a July 2012 production of Regina Summer Stage.

The novel Euphoria by Connie Gault won the 2009 Saskatchewan Book Award for Fiction and  prominently features the Regina Cyclone.

See also
 List of Canadian tornadoes and tornado outbreaks

Gallery

References

Further reading 
 

Tornadoes of 1912
1912 in Canada
F4 tornadoes by date
Regina,1912-06-30
History of Regina, Saskatchewan
1912-06-30
Regina,1912-06-30
1912 in Saskatchewan
June 1912 events
1912 disasters in Canada